Shooting the Warwicks is an American film directed by Adam Rifkin and adapted from his Showtime series Reality Show.  It was released in August 2015. Both the film and the series star Adam Rifkin, Constantine Paraskevopoulos, Scott Anderson, Monika Tilling and Kelley Hensley. Also featuring Jude B. Lanston in the supporting role of Lt. Simmons.

References

External links
 

2015 films
Films directed by Adam Rifkin
American comedy-drama films
2015 comedy-drama films
2010s English-language films
2010s American films